Keystone Heights is a city located in southwestern Clay County, Florida, United States. The population of the city was 1,446 at the 2020 census and increased to 1,478 in 2021. The city's name is derived from the state of Pennsylvania's nickname, the "Keystone State". Keystone Heights is the southwestern most city in the Jacksonville metropolitan area, home to 1,637,666 residents.

Keystone Heights is the principal city and primary economic driver of the Lake Region, a region in Florida consisting of southwestern Clay County and parts of Bradford, Putnam, and Alachua counties, known for its many lakes.

History

Early years and founding 
In 1917, the area that would eventually become known as the city of Keystone Heights was a small community known as Brooklyn located along present day State Road 100, about one mile north of the present location of Keystone Heights on Lake Brooklyn.

In those early days Brooklyn consisted of a large unpainted building called the Brooklyn Hotel; a combination general store and post office; and several small houses scattered about. Property Developer John J. Lawrence, who hailed from Pennsylvania, noticed the area on a visit to Lake Brooklyn, and instantly became attracted to the region.

In 1920, the Lawrence family completed their home, the first house built in Keystone Heights, which overlooked Lake Geneva, and still lies there today at the corner of Jasmine Avenue & Lawrence Blvd. (State Road 21). After hearing of natural wonders and the many different lakes of the area, other families moved to Keystone, putting a strain on those attempting to build structures within the city. Helping to address the issue, in late 1921, C. Ray Lawrence came to Keystone Heights, and began laying out the streets and lots in the city.

The town would be incorporated as Keystone Heights, named after Lawrence's home state of Pennsylvania's nickname, the "Keystone State", in 1925.

20th and 21st centuries

Keystone Inn era 
The opening of the Keystone Inn on New Year's Day in 1923 was one of the most significant events in the early history of the city. The inn hosted many festivals and socials, becoming an important centerpiece of the town.

Tourists visiting the inn would often also frequent the nearby Chautauqua. A large open pit that effectively served as a type of amphitheater, the Chautauqua served as a beacon for various musicians, artists, and speakers from the Chautauqua circuit in New York.

Within two years of opening, visitors traveled to the Keystone Inn and the community of Keystone Heights from across the country to experience the town for themselves. The small community boasted a public beach with a pavilion, picnic grounds and a nine-hole golf course. The University of Florida's football team would even stay at the inn before their homecoming games.

The inn no longer exists. It burned down in October 1954, and was never rebuilt. However, it did play an important role in transforming Keystone Heights into a popular vacation destination, a status it still holds today. The former property of the inn is now a park in front of City Hall.

1960 to present 
In 1984, an American sycamore seedling, germinated by the United States Forest Service, was planted at the Keystone Heights Library. The "Moon Tree" traveled with Stuart Roosa, a former U.S. Forest Service smokejumper, aboard the Apollo 14 mission on January 31, 1971. Roosa and his five varieties of seeds orbited the moon 34 times and the resulting seedlings were planted all around the United States and the world.

In the early 2000s, the city saw its tourism industry decline as many of its surrounding lakes, which serve as a primary inflow point for the Floridan aquifer, nearly disappeared. Increased rainfall totals in the 2010s have helped in the recovery of many area lakes including Lake Brooklyn and Lake Geneva.

The Black Creek Pipeline, a $43.3 million project to pump excess water from Black Creek in central Clay County to Alligator Creek just north of Lake Brooklyn, is expected to further restore lake levels. The project began in August 2022.

In fall of 2021, Keystone Heights served as the host of the internationally televised Nitro Rallycross North America Championship at the Florida International Rally and Motorsports Park at the Keystone Heights Airport. In April 2022, Keystone Beach hosted the Motosurf Games, a motorized surfboard racing contest on Lake Geneva that was televised on CBS Sports. The games are expected to return to the city in 2023 and include jet ski racing.

Geography

Keystone Heights is located in Northeast Florida in the southwest corner of Clay County, at  (29.787243, –82.033026). The city overlooks the north shore of Lake Geneva and is bordered to the west by Bradford County and to the north by Lake Brooklyn. State Road 21 leads northeast  (via SR 16) to Green Cove Springs, the Clay County seat, and south  to Hawthorne. SR 100 crosses SR 21 and leads north  to Starke and southeast  to Palatka.

Demographics

2020 Census 

As of the census of 2020, the population of Keystone Heights was 1,446. Hispanic or Latino residents comprised 5.8% of the population or 84 individuals. Among those not Hispanic or Latino, 1,306 (90.3%) were White alone or in combination, 41 (2.8%) were Black alone or in combination, 37 (2.6%) were Asian alone or in combination, 50 (3.5%) were American Indian or Alaska Native alone or in combination, and 33 (2.3%) were some other race alone or in combination.

There were 595 households, out of which 556 (93.4%) were occupied.

2021 American Community Survey 
According to the 2021 ACS, the median age in Keystone Heights was 34.3 years. 29.2% of residents were 0–19 years, 10.9% were 20–29, 17.2% were 30–39, 9.8% were 40–49, 12.2% were 50–59, and 20.8% were 60 years and over.

There were 550 households in the city, of which 36% had children under 18 living with them, 40.5% were married couples living together, and 40.9% were individual householders with no spouse or partner present. The average household size was 2.71 and the average family size was 3.13.

The median income for a household in the city was $61,250, and the median income for a family was $61,625. Males had a median income of $51,488 versus $49,063 for females. The per capita income was $30,116. About 15.7% of the population were below the poverty line including 28.5% of those under age 18 and 5.7% of those age 65 and over.

The ten largest ancestry groups in the city were German (14.4%), Irish (9.9%), English (7.2%), American (4.7%), Italian (4.6%), Polish (2.7%), Dutch (2.4%), Russian (1.5%), Welsh (1.4%), and European (1.3%). Other ancestral groups accounted for 15.8% of the population. The majority of residents (96.4%) speak only English at home. Of those that speak a language other than English at home, the top languages were Vietnamese (1.7%), Spanish (1.1%), and French (0.3%).

Over half of residents (59.2%) were born in Florida. 37% of residents were born in another state, primarily other southern states. There is a small community of immigrants in Keystone Heights, accounting for 3.5% of the population. Over 92% of these immigrants are naturalized with the majority entering the United States prior to 2010.

City government

Keystone Heights has a Council–manager form of government, with a mayor, vice mayor and three council members, all elected at large. They serve three-year terms. The current City Manager is Lynn Rutkowski.

The current office holders are:
 Keystone Heights City Council Seat 1 – Tony Brown
 Keystone Heights City Council Seat 2 – Christine Thompson
 Keystone Heights City Council Seat 3 – Bobby Brown      
 Keystone Heights City Council Seat 4 – Karen Lake
 Keystone Heights City Council Seat 5 – Stephen Hart

Education 

 Keystone Heights Junior/Senior High School
 Keystone Heights Elementary School

Schools within Keystone Heights are operated by the Clay County School District (Florida).

Higher Education

 Santa Fe College's Watson Center located just outside city limits in Bradford County serves southern Clay and Bradford counties as an important learning and cultural institution.

References

External links
 City of Keystone Heights
 Keystone Heights Airport
 Keystone Heights history and demographics

Cities in Clay County, Florida
Cities in the Jacksonville metropolitan area
Cities in Florida